Costel Grasu (born 5 June 1967 in Fetești, Ialomița) is a Romanian discus thrower.

He is perhaps best known for finishing fourth at the 1992 Summer Olympics. He also competed at the Olympics in 1996 and 2000, without reaching the final. Other achievements include gold medals at the Jeux de la Francophonie in 1994 and 1997 as well as gold medals at the Balkan Games in 1992 and 1997. His personal best throw is 67.08 metres, achieved in Snagov in May 1992. 

Costel Grasu is married to Nicoleta Grasu, née Grădinaru. Their son Ștefan Grasu is a professional basketball player.

Achievements

References

1967 births
Living people
Romanian male discus throwers
Athletes (track and field) at the 1992 Summer Olympics
Athletes (track and field) at the 1996 Summer Olympics
Athletes (track and field) at the 2000 Summer Olympics
Olympic athletes of Romania
People from Fetești